Carex paxii is a tussock-forming perennial in the family Cyperaceae. It is native to eastern parts of Asia.

See also
 List of Carex species

References

paxii
Plants described in 1909
Taxa named by Georg Kükenthal
Flora of Japan
Flora of China
Flora of Korea